Zaur Aliaga ogly Jafarov (Azerbaijani: Zaur Aliaga ogly Jafarov; born September 5, 1982) is an Azerbaijani powerlifter, Honored Master of Sports of Azerbaijan, eight-time champion of Azerbaijan, four-time world and four-time European champion.

Biography

Education 
Born on September 5, 1982, in the Azerbaijani city of Sumgait. He received his secondary education at the Lyceum of Technical and Natural Sciences No.32 of Sumgait city. In 1998–2002, he studied at the Faculty of Engineering and Management of the Azerbaijan Technical University, receiving a bachelor's degree. In 2002–2004, he continued his studies at the Faculty of Economics and Management of the Azerbaijan Economic University, after graduating from the magistracy of which he received a diploma with honors. In 2004–2007 he received his third higher education at Sumgait State University, after which he defended his doctoral dissertation in the specialty "personnel management in the agricultural sector".

Family 
Jafarov is married and lives in Baku. Has three sons.

Sports career 
Since 1997, he began to play sports professionally, later starting to take part in the republican championships in powerlifting. In his debut, 2010, he climbed to the highest step of the podium. The Azerbaijan Powerlifting Federation has attracted Zaur Jafarov to the national team. In 2015, he was selected "Sportsman of the Year".

Achievements

References

External links
 Zaur Jafarov's profile on the allpowerlifting.com
 Zaur Jafarov's profile on the openpowerlifting.org
 World Championship WPC single-ply benchpressDolgoprudniy, Russia 03-05 November 2017
 WPC Worlds 2019 Day3 EQ BP-Kg Results
 Dördqat dünya və dördqat Avropa çempionu Zaur Cəfərov Prezidentə yazır
 “Ağrıya dözməyi bacarırsansa, qalib gələcəksən”
 Öz ölkəni dünyada tanıtmaqdan gözəl stimul ola bilməz – Zaur Cəfərovun müsahibəsi
 Çempiondan Prezidentə: “Siz Azərbaycanı yaşadır, inkişaf etdirirsiniz»
 president.az: Zaur Cəfərovdan, Bakı, Azərbaycan

1982 births
Living people
People from Sumgait
Azerbaijani powerlifters